Coccinella leonina, common name orange-spotted ladybird, is a species of ladybird native to New Zealand. It is black with orange spots. A predator species, it is present in a variety of habitats.

Identification 
Coccinella leonina or as its common name of orange spotted ladybird suggests, has 16 yellow/orange spots  on its black body, with a squarish yellow/orange spot on both sides above the pronotum on the thorax and then 14 other spots on its black elytra which are larger and mostly separated by 1 mm diameter of the black background at the most. The shade of these spots can vary on different beetles. It also has a paler blotch above its eyes. The legs and underside are black. Its length typically varies between 4.5 and 5.5 mm long. The elytra is an oval shape that is widest in the middle and the abdomen has slightly different shape between male and female. The abdomen is truncate in males and more rounded in females. The orange spotted ladybird is a medium-sized ladybird which has a hemispheric shape.

Distribution

Globally 
The orange-spotted ladybird is endemic to New Zealand, and the only species of the Coccinella genus endemic to Australasia.

New Zealand 
Orange spotted ladybirds are recorded over the North Island and South Island. It can be found in the Port Hills in Canterbury. It is also found further down in New Zealand's South Island in areas including the Otago Plateau and in Central Otago. They do not occur on the northern part of the mainland, not on the mainland of Auckland, Coromandel or Northland. However, they are found on close offshore Islands to the North Island like Poor Knights Island, Hen Island and Chicken Islands, Mokohinau Islands, Great Barrier Island, Little Barrier Island, inner Hauraki Gulf islands, Mercury Island, Aldermen Island and Mayor Island.

Habitat preferences 
This species can be from subalpine altitudes to as low as sea level and are common in areas where they live. They can be found in tussock grasslands and in vegetation that is low down. It is also found in native bush areas, pastures and crops. They are very common in areas like banks peninsula.

Life cycle 
The orange-spotted ladybird sexually reproduces. The mating process begins around September. Oval shaped, yellow-orange eggs are laid by a female ladybird, normally in a cluster laid on the underside of some kind of leaf. The time it takes for the eggs to fully develop is dependent on favorable temperatures. In the few days leading up to the eggs hatching they begin to darken to a greyish colour. Up to 30 eggs can be laid by a female per day, and as many as 1600 to 3800 in a lifetime. Larvae hatch from the eggs by breaking the shell with sharp, circular structures on the back of their head called egg-busters. The larvae of the beetle eat the same food as the adults, the main purpose of this stage of the life-cycle is to eat to grow. In order to molt its skin the larva hangs itself upside down by the anal organ. The larva's skin splits along the dorsal midline. Larvae will molt several times before its last molt, the fourth time it sheds, when the pupa emerges pale and soft, as it gets older it grows a hard, patterned pupal case. During the pupal stage some of the internal tissues and organs are broken down and used in the production of adult body parts including reproductive organs and wings. This would normally take around four to ten days, but can take longer in colder conditions. When the adult beetle emerges its elytra does not yet have its distinctive pattern and is instead matte, soft and pale. It can take up to months for the beetle to reach its full mature appearance After emerging the adult will then either search for food, mate or prepare to hibernate depending on the time of year. An adult ladybird can live from a couple of months to over a year.

As adults, ladybirds spend the winter grouped in hidden and sheltered spots, dispersing in spring to find food and a good place to lay eggs.

Diet and foraging 
The orange-spotted ladybird mainly feeds on aphids, which is common for most ladybird species. Adult ladybirds can eat around 100 aphids per day. They also like to eat other small insects such as mites, mealybugs, scale insects and, as well as other plant matter, some fungi like powdery mildews. This species has a wide range of habitats and is mainly found in areas where aphids are abundant.

Predators, parasites and diseases 
Like many other insects, one of the main predators to the orange-spotted ladybird are birds. The shining cuckoo and starlings are examples of birds that are often predators of the orange-spotted ladybird. Another predator is the harlequin ladybird, Harmonia axyridis, which has recently arrived in New Zealand. They do not prey on orange spotted ladybirds specifically but do eat native ladybirds when they run out of food and as they are much larger can overcome orange spotted ladybirds and easily out-compete with them for resources.

Other information
Another species in the same genus found in New Zealand is the introduced eleven-spot ladybird, Coccinella undecimpunctata, which looks quite different from this species. Despite this, it has a similar size and ecological niche. Both species occur in the South Island and south of the North Island, but in the north of the North Island only the introduced species is found. However, it is present on islands in areas where it is absent on the mainland, and may be displaced on the mainland as a result of interspecific competition.

See also 
 Hoangus venustus, another native ladybird

References

Beetles described in 1775
Beetles of New Zealand
Coccinellidae
Taxa named by Johan Christian Fabricius